The 1901–02 Columbia men's ice hockey season was the 6th season of play for the program.

Season
The team did not have a coach, however, William Shoemaker served as team manager.

Note: Columbia University adopted the Lion as its mascot in 1910.

Roster

Standings

Schedule and Results

|-
!colspan=12 style=";" | Regular Season

References

Columbia Lions men's ice hockey seasons
Columbia
Columbia
Columbia
Columbia